Animals of the Bible is a book illustrated by Dorothy P. Lathrop with text compiled by Helen Dean Fish from the Bible. Released by J. B. Lippincott Company, it was the first recipient of the Caldecott Medal for illustration in 1938.

Plot 
Animals of the Bible takes 31 Biblical stories of creatures  who helped Biblical heroes complete their tasks and illustrates them.

References

1937 children's books
American picture books
Caldecott Medal–winning works
J. B. Lippincott & Co. books
Books based on the Bible